Major Wilfrid Foulston Vernon (1882 – 1 December 1975) was a Labour Party politician in the United Kingdom who served as a Member of Parliament (MP) between 1945 and 1951.

Early life 
Educated in the Stationers' Company's School and the City and Guilds Technical College in London.

Career

Military service 
Vernon served in the RNVR during the First World War, before becoming a squadron major in the RNAS and was a major in the RAF in its early days.

During 1918 he worked in the flying boat section at Felixstowe airbase and after the war became the chief draughtsman for the British Aeroplane Company. From 1925 to 1937 he worked at the Royal Aircraft Establishment, from which he was dismissed for failing to take proper care of classified information. He had also been earlier implicated in encouraging sedition at the Aldershot army camp.

During the Second World War he was involved in the foundation of the Osterley Park Home Guard School and was an instructor at the Dorking Home Guard Training School until December 1942. He later became a WEA tutor in Bournemouth and Portsmouth.

Member of Parliament 
He was elected MP for Dulwich in the 1945 general election, but lost the seat in the 1951 election. He later served as a member of the London County Council, representing Dulwich and as a councillor in Camberwell.

In January 1948, Vernon gave a speech on China in the House of Commons denouncing Chiang Kai-shek's Nationalist government and endorsing Mao Zedong's Communists.  Vernon claimed that "the Chinese government are running one of the most ruthless and cruel police states in existence", and called for Britain to adopt "a policy of friendship and trade with the liberated areas" under Communist control.

Vernon was a member of the Fabian Society.

Spying for the Soviet Union 
In 1952, he admitted having been part of a pre-war Soviet espionage ring.

Personal life 
He married Josephine Jervis in 1907, and again after the death of his first wife, to Laura Gladys Meade, in 1918. His second wife died in 1972. They had two children. He died in Bristol at the age of 93.

References 
 Obituary, The Times, 3 December 1975 and "The Very Strange case of Major Vernon - MP and spy", Duncan Bowie, The Dulwich Society, Journal 205, Summe 2020.

External links 
 

1882 births
1972 deaths
Labour Party (UK) MPs for English constituencies
UK MPs 1945–1950
UK MPs 1950–1951
Members of London County Council
Politics of the London Borough of Southwark
Royal Naval Volunteer Reserve personnel of World War I
Royal Navy officers of World War I
Members of Camberwell Metropolitan Borough Council
People educated at the Stationers' Company's School